The 1951 All-Ireland Senior Camogie Championship Final was the twentieth All-Ireland Final and the deciding match of the 1951 All-Ireland Senior Camogie Championship, an inter-county camogie tournament for the top teams in Ireland.

Dublin rushed into a 4-3 to 0-1 lead within twelve minutes, and never looked worried. Sophie Brack was their top scorer with 4-2, while Eileen Burke scored two goals.

References

All-Ireland Senior Camogie Championship Final
All-Ireland Senior Camogie Championship Final
All-Ireland Senior Camogie Championship Final, 1951
All-Ireland Senior Camogie Championship Finals
Dublin county camogie team matches